The American Association of Sexuality Educators, Counselors and Therapists (AASECT) is a professional organization for sexuality educators, sexuality counselors and sex therapists.

History and overview

AASECT was founded by Patricia Schiller in 1967. AASECT publishes the peer-reviewed journals American Journal of Sexuality Education and the Journal of Sex Education and Therapy. They have also published a directory of sex therapists since 1976 and have initiated therapeutic options via phone and online.  AASECT is the largest organization that certifies sexual health practitioners.  AASECT offers certification of sexual health practitioners in four categories: sexuality educator, sex counselor, sex therapist (CST) and supervisor (CST-S).

Notable people
Kristin Hodson, therapist and prominent voice on the topic of sexual health in the Church of Jesus Christ of Latter-day Saints community
Patricia Schiller, American lawyer, clinical psychologist, sex educator and founder of AASECT
Denise Stapley, winner of Survivor: Philippines

Awards

Book Award
 (2021) The Leather Couch: Clinical Practice with Kinky Clients, Stefani Goerlich
 (2020) Trans+: Love, Sex, Romance, and Being You
 (2019) The Art of Sex Therapy Supervision
 (2018) The Wiley Handbook for Sex Therapy
 (2017) A Clinician's Guide to Systemic Sex Therapy
 (2016) The Teaching Transgender Toolkit: A Facilitator's Guide to Increasing Knowledge, Decreasing Prejudice and Building Skills
 (2016) A Guide to Transgender and Genger Non-Conforming Youth, Their Parents and Everyone Else
 (2015) Secrets of the Sex Masters
 (2015) Mirror of Intimacy: Daily Reflections on Emotional and Erotic Intelligence
 (2014) Expanding the Practice of Sex Therapy: An Integrative Model for Exploring Desire and Intimacy
 (2013) New Directions in Sex Therapy: Innovations and Alternatives, 2nd Edition
 (2013) Teaching Safer Sex, 3rd edition
 (2011) Enduring Desire: Your Guide to Lifelong Intimacy
 (2010) The Orgasm Answer Guide

Professional Standard of Excellence Award
The winners of the award are:
 (2021) Sara Nasserzadeh
 (2020) Debby Herbenick
 (2019) Laura A. Jacobs
 (2018) Ruby Bouie Johnson
 (2017) Sallie Foley
 (2016) Jose Pando
 (2013) Gina Ogden
 (2012) Michael A. Perelman
 (2011) Sandra Cole
 (2010) Mark Schoen
 (2009) David Schnarch, James W. Maddock, Gorm Wagner, Sandra Leiblum, Ray Rosen, Eli Coleman, Beverly Whipple, William Yarber, Douglas Kirby, William Stayton, Laird Sutton, Carey Bayer

References

External links
AASECT website
AASECT Resources for Continuing Education

Sex education in the United States
Sexuality in the United States
Sex therapy